Metcash Trading is an Australian conglomerate company headquartered in Wooloomooloo, NSW.

Metcash is a distributing and marketing support in supermarket groceries, perishables, fresh produce, alcoholic beverages, hardware, and other consumer goods. 

Retailers of note the company owns include supermarkets and convenience stores IGA, Campbell's Wholesale,  Cash and Carry and IGA Foodland  

Hardware retailers include Mitre 10, Home Hardware and Thrifty-Link Hardware.

Automotive business
Metcash took a majority share in Automotive Brands Group Autobarn and more for $53 million in 2012 and incorporated it into its automotive division. The company then sold its automotive division to Burson Group (now Bapcor) in 2015 for $275 million. The chief executive officer of the automotive division was Supercar driver Paul Dumbrell.

Company divisions

Metcash Food & Grocery Supermarkets
 IGA
 Supa IGA/Foodland

Metcash Convenience
 Campbells Wholesale
 Campbells Cash & Carry
 Cash & Carry WA
 C-Store Distribution
 Lucky 7 Convenience Store
 IGA X-Press stores
 Friendly Grocer
 Local Grocery IGA stores
 Eziway Food stores
 Fresh Pantry

Australian Liquor Marketers (ALM)

Australian Liquor Marketers is the liquor arm of Metcash, running liquor store franchises and distributing liquor to businesses around Australia and New Zealand. Its almost 2900 franchisees operate under the brand names The Bottle O, Cellarbrations, IGA liquor, Duncan's Liquor, Thirsty Camel, Big Bargain Liquor, Porter's Liquor and Merchants Liquor.

The company has 13 distribution centres across every state and territory of Australia, and a distribution centre in New Zealand. It is Australia's largest supplier of liquor to independently owned liquor retailers and largest broad-range liquor wholesaler, supplying to 12,000 liquor customers.

Metcash Hardware (IHG)
 Mitre 10
 Home Hardware
 Thrifty-Link Hardware
 True Value Hardware
 Hardings
 Total Tools

Brands
 Community Co
 Black and Gold 
 Foodland products

IGA Ambassador 

• Shane Jacobson- Australian actor (IGA Ambassador)

References

External links
Official website

Conglomerate companies of Australia
Companies listed on the Australian Securities Exchange
1927 establishments in Australia
Retail companies established in 1927
Australian grocers